The 2014–15 Israeli Noar Premier League was the 21st season since its introduction in 1994 as the top-tier football in Israel for teenagers between the ages 18–20, and the 4th under the name Noar Premier League.

Maccabi Tel Aviv won the title, whilst Hapoel Ramat Gan and Hapoel Petah Tikva were relegated. Bnei Sakhnin (from the Northern division) and Bnei Yehuda (from the Southern division)  won their respective Noar Leumit League divisions and promotion to 2015–16.

Final table

References

External links
 2014-2015 Noar Premier League IFA 

Israeli Noar Premier League seasons
Youth